State Route 210 (SR 210), also known as Ross Clark Circle or simply "The Circle" to locals, is a route overlaid by US 84, US 231, and US 431 encircling Dothan, Alabama in Houston County. For many years, the SR 210 designation appeared on state road maps but was not actually signed as such.  This has changed in recent years and today the SR 210 designation is noted on signs along with the US Routes that share its circumference of Dothan.

Route description

SR 210 forms a beltway around Dothan and is used by local traffic and motorists bound for other regions. The highway's mile markers are posted clockwise along the route and begins at the intersection with US 231/South Oates Street on the south side of the city. The three major U.S. routes that run through Dothan (84, 231, and 431) are all concurrent with the route at some point on the circle.

History

The road was constructed in the late 1950s and was made possible by former Alabama governor "Big Jim" Folsom who authorized the state expenditures.  He directed that the road be named for Ross Clark, Folsom's brother-in-law, who had committed suicide in 1955.

Major intersections

References

210
Bypasses in Alabama
Transportation in Houston County, Alabama
Beltways in the United States
Dothan, Alabama